Live in Los Angeles is the first live album from American country music songwriter Brandy Clark, released as part of Record Store Day promotions on April 22, 2017 with a digital release on August 18.

Reception
Tony Ives of Americana Music Show called the recording "bliss" with "two of the best country songs" to have ever graced his ears on the recording. Rolling Stone called the performance Clark at "her storytelling best, whether taking on delicate ballads... or lighthearted romps". In The Los Angeles Times, Randy Clark called the album "smart to its core", praising the depth, breadth, and humor of the lyrics.

Track listing
"Drinkin' Smokin' Cheatin'" (Brandy Clark) – 3:26
"Stripes" (Clark, Matt Jenkins, Shane McAnally) – 3:02
"Big Day in a Small Town" (Clark, Mark D. Sanders, McAnally) – 3:44
"Hold My Hand" (Clark, Mark Stephen Jones) – 3:54
"Daughter" (Clark, Jessie Jo Dillon, Jeremy Spillman) – 3:59
"Love Can Go to Hell" (Clark, Scott Stepakoff) – 3:57
"Girl Next Door" (Clark, Dillon, McAnally) – 5:22
"Get High" (Clark) – 3:33
"When I Get to Drinkin'" (Clark, Josh Osborne, Stepakoff) – 3:46
"Since You've Gone to Heaven" (Clark, McAnally) – 4:22
"Pray to Jesus" (Clark, McAnally) – 3:24

Personnel
Brandy Clark – guitar, vocals

Miles Aubrey – backing vocals, guitar
Chip Matthews – tracking
Tal Miller – mastering
Sarah Pearson – photography
Stephen Walker – art direction, design

References

External links

An episode of Mountain Stage with Clark and Miles Aubrey from NPR

Interview with Clark, discussing the recording
Country Universe review
Review in Entertainment Focus

2017 live albums
Brandy Clark live albums
Record Store Day releases
Warner Records live albums